Pir Hajat (also Romanized as Pīr Ḩājāt and Pir-i-Hajat; also known as Pīr Hāji and Pir Hajji) is a village in Pir Hajat Rural District, in the Central District of Tabas County, South Khorasan Province, Iran. At the 2006 census, its population was 165, in 62 families.

References 

Populated places in Tabas County